Scrobipalpa stabilis is a moth in the family Gelechiidae. It was described by Povolný in 1977. It is found in southern Spain.

The forewings are dark ash-grey with three double marks, ringed with brownish. The hindwings are shining dark grey.

References

Scrobipalpa
Moths described in 1977
Taxa named by Dalibor Povolný